Sierra Canyon School (SCS) is a private, coeducational university-preparatory day school located in Los Angeles, California. Sierra Canyon enrolls students in preschool through grade 12.

Sierra Canyon School is accredited by the California Association of Independent Schools (CAIS). SCS is a member of National Association of Independent Schools (NAIS) and the Western Association of Schools and Colleges (WASC).

History
Sierra Canyon School began in 1972 as the Sierra Canyon Day Camp, started by founders Mick Horwitz and Howard Wang, a proprietary endeavor that became the impetus for starting the school. In 1978, the needs of the North San Fernando Valley spurred the evolution from a day camp into Sierra Canyon Elementary School. The elementary school began with 150 students, spanning Early Kindergarten through 6th grade.

In 1990, Sierra Canyon was the only school in Los Angeles, and the only private school in California, to be honored as a Recognized School of Excellence by the U.S. Department of Education. Founding directors Mick Horwitz and Howard Wang, and Principal Ann Gillinger received the Blue Ribbon Award of Excellence in Education from President George H. W. Bush at the White House.

By 2001, the school had grown to nearly 700 students from early kindergarten through 8th grade. An independent, non-sectarian, co-educational high school had not been built in the San Fernando Valley since 1961, during which time the Valley's population had grown by 60 percent. The need for a high school prompted the founders to appoint James P. Skrumbis as head of school in 2004 in order to expand and open an Upper School. The new Upper School opened in 2006, serving 7th through 12th grades.  The upper and lower schools merged and incorporated as a non-profit organization for early kindergarten through 12th grade and established itself as a college preparatory private school. Sierra Canyon graduated its first senior class in June 2009.

Each summer, over 600 campers still come to Sierra Canyon for its Sierra Canyon Day Camp program.

Educational program
Sierra Canyon School offers all students a fully UC-approved, comprehensive, four-year curriculum that includes extensive honors and advanced-placement courses. At the beginning of the seventh grade year, each student is assigned an academic advisor.

The SCS International Program welcomes nearly 70 foreign students from countries such as Brazil, China, Germany, India, Korea, Russia, and Singapore to its Upper Campus each year to study with fellow students in 9th through 12th grades.

Athletic program
Sierra Canyon School participates in a full range of interscholastic athletics as a member of the CIF Southern Section. Boys' teams include lacrosse, football, baseball, basketball, soccer, tennis, wrestling, cross country, track, golf, and swimming during the school year. Girls have the opportunity to compete in soccer, basketball, tennis, softball, beach volleyball, cross country, track, swimming, and volleyball.

In 2009, the girls' basketball team became the first to win a California Interscholastic Federation Southern Section title in any sport for the school.

In 2015, the boys' and girls' basketball teams won California Interscholastic Federation State championships. It was the first time in school history that both the boys' and girls' teams won a state basketball championship in the same year. The girls' basketball championship was their third consecutive state title.

In 2015, the girls' soccer team won the California Interscholastic Federation Regional championships. The football team won the California Interscholastic Federation Southern Section championship, and the following year, 2016, the Trailblazers won the CIF-Southern Section Championship, won the CIF State Southern California regional and won the CIF State championship, finishing the season with a 16-0 record.

In the 2016 fall season, the Trailblazers won the CIF-SS Division 4 Championship in Football and won its first ever CIF-SS Championship in girls' volleyball. During winter, the Trailblazers won their third ever CIF-SS soccer championship and second regional championship.

The 2016-2017 school year was very successful, as the Trailblazers won a school record eight league titles (football, girls' volleyball, boys' basketball, girls' soccer, lacrosse, golf, and softball).

In 2017, Sierra Canyon girls' volleyball team won the regional and state championships, the first state volleyball championship for the school.

In 2019, the boys' high school basketball team added Bronny James, son of NBA player LeBron James, later joined by five-star basketball recruit Ziaire Williams and Zaire Wade, son of NBA player Dwyane Wade. 

The Sierra Canyon boys' basketball team held a media day on October 10, 2019 - one of few high school teams to do so. The media day attracted local and national news outlets.

Campus
The campus is park-like with more than 700 trees, groomed lawns, flowers, and a custom designed horse trail on the lower campus which continues into Brown's Canyon. The lower campus includes a computer lab, a music room, and library. The upper campus includes a technology center, a media center for digital filmmaking, the black-box theater, and the Upper School Library.  In the Spring of 2010, the student-designed Community Garden was added at the top of the campus.

Notable alumni

 Marvin Bagley III, basketball player for the Detroit Pistons
 Amari Bailey, college basketball player for UCLA
 Ireland Baldwin, model and daughter of actors Alec Baldwin and Kim Basinger
 Brandon Boston Jr., pro basketball player for the Los Angeles Clippers
 Cecilia Cassini, fashion designer
 Jarron Collins, professional basketball player and coach
 Jason Collins, professional basketball player, first male openly gay active athlete in the four major North American sports
 Corinne Foxx, actress and daughter of Jamie Foxx
 G Hannelius, actress and singer
 Kendall Jenner, American socialite, reality television star, model
 Kylie Jenner, American socialite, reality television star, founder and CEO of Kylie Cosmetics
 Michael Kuluva, Professional Figure Skater & Fashion Designer of Tumbler and Tipsy
 Kenyon Martin Jr., basketball player for the Houston Rockets, son of Kenyon Martin
 Ziaire Williams, basketball player for the Memphis Grizzlies
 Scotty Pippen Jr., basketball player for the Los Angeles Lakers, son of Scottie Pippen and Larsa Pippen
 Willow Smith, singer, actress and daughter of actors Jada and Will Smith
 Cassius Stanley, basketball player for the Motor City Cruise

Notable students
 Bronny James, high school basketball player, son of LeBron James
 Bryce James, high school basketball player, son of LeBron James

See also
 Amazon Freevee
 4th Critics' Choice Real TV Awards

References

External links
 
 Sierra Canyon High School Foundation - ProPublica

Private elementary schools in California
Private middle schools in California
Private high schools in California
Preparatory schools in California
1972 establishments in California
Educational institutions established in 1972
Chatsworth, Los Angeles